David John Munro (born July 1948) was Surrey Police and Crime Commissioner (PCC) from 2016 to 2021. A former Conservative PCC, he stood as an independent candidate in 2021 and was defeated.

Background and career 
He was educated at Bishop Wordsworth's School and Peterhouse, Cambridge, where he read Engineering and History, graduating in 1972. He spent 18 years in the Royal Engineers, rising to the rank of major. After leaving the military — partly due to his sexuality, as LGBTQ+ personnel could not serve openly in the UK until 2000 — he was approached and interviewed for a further career in espionage but being gay meant that MI5 were not interested in interviewing him further.

He was elected to Waverley Borough Council and to Farnham Town Council in 1995, having been a Conservative activist since 1987, and to Surrey County Council in 1997, standing down shortly after being elected as PCC.

In December 2018, he was unsuccessful in his bid to gain automatic reselection as the Conservative candidate; the following March he lost his reselection battle to Charlotte Chirico, a solicitor. After his deselection,  he left the Conservative group at the Association of PCCs to join the independents. In September 2019 he was expelled from the Conservative Party for having “campaigned against Conservative Party candidates”, which he denied. The next PCC elections had been scheduled for 7 May 2020 but, due to the COVID-19 pandemic in England, the elections were postponed to May 2021, with a further party reselection in February 2021 choosing Lisa Townsend as the Conservative candidate against him.

Personal life 
Munro is openly gay and has been in a relationship — and subsequently a civil partnership — with a professor of classics since before he left the army.

References

External links
 Official website (archived)

1948 births
Living people
People educated at Bishop Wordsworth's School
Alumni of Peterhouse, Cambridge
Police and crime commissioners in England
Conservative Party (UK) councillors
Conservative Party police and crime commissioners
Members of Surrey County Council
English LGBT politicians
LGBT military personnel
21st-century LGBT people